William King (1939-1987), was an American fashion photographer.

According to his ex-boyfriend, hairdresser Harry King, "He was kind, sweet, lovely, and a great photographer, but Bill did too many drugs and got off on people's misfortunes."

He died of AIDS at the Beth Israel Hospital in New York in 1987.

References

1939 births
1987 deaths
AIDS-related deaths in New York (state)
20th-century American photographers
Fashion photographers